Ghislain-Joseph Henry (1754-1820) was an architect, garden designer and topiarist, notable for his work for Louis XVI of France, the Holy Roman Emperor, Napoleon I and William I of the Netherlands.

Life
He was born in Dinant (then in the Principality of Liège) in 1754 into a family which originated in Profondeville (Namur). He won first prize for architecture in the Clementine Competition at the Academy of Saint Luke in 1779 and studied at the Academy of Saint Luke in Rome. In 1803 he became one of the founder members of the Société de peinture, sculpture et architecture de Bruxelles and in 1816 he joined the academic council of the Académie royale des beaux-arts de Bruxelles.

Works

Architecture
 1786-1789 : Château de Duras, in Palladian style
 Major restoration, château de Laeken, of which he became curator
 Works, château de Seneffe.
 Portico, Enghien, for the duke of Arenberg.
 1815-1829 : extensions to the Royal Palace of Brussels

Topiary
 Parc à l'anglaise, château de Wespelaar.
 Park and 'factories', château de Beauraing, owned by the duc de Beaufort Spontin.
 Design for a parc à l'anglaise, commanderie des Vieux Joncs.

References

Architects of the Austrian Netherlands
1754 births
1820 deaths
People from Dinant
People of the Prince-Bishopric of Liège
Landscape or garden designers